Christopher Michael Lowery (born July 7, 1972) is an American college basketball coach currently serving as an assistant men's basketball coach at Northwestern University under head coach Chris Collins. He was previously the head men's basketball coach at Southern Illinois University Carbondale. He started in the spring of 2004 and was fired on March 2, 2012.

Playing and coaching career
Born in Evansville, Indiana, Lowery was a standout player for the Evansville Harrison Warriors, bridging the "Calbert Cheaney-era" to the "Walter McCarty-era," Lowery played at Southern Illinois for legendary Rich Herrin from 1990-1994 and later became an assistant coach, eventually serving under Bruce Weber at Southern Illinois and moving with him to Illinois after the 2002–03 season. On April 9, 2004, Lowery was named the head coach of Southern Illinois men's basketball team after Matt Painter left to become an associate head coach/head coach designate to Gene Keady at Purdue University.

On March 1, 2007, Lowery was named Missouri Valley Conference Coach of the Year after leading SIU to a 25–5 regular season record. A highlight win for the season was when they beat the highly ranked Butler Bulldogs on the road. The Salukis received a four-seed in the 2007 NCAA tournament, the highest for any Valley team since Indiana State received a one-seed in 1979.

On April 2, 2007, Lowery signed a seven-year contract extension. worth $750,000 annually. On March 10, 2011, Lowery received a vote of confidence from athletic director Mario Moccia at a joint press conference, despite Southern Illinois suffering its third season with a .500 record or below and growing pressure from fans and alumni to fire Lowery.

Lowery and the Salukis finished the 2011–12 season on March 1, posting an 8–23 overall record with a 5–13  mark in conference play. Lowery was fired the following morning.

Lowery was hired as an assistant to Weber at Kansas State University on April 5, 2012.

Lowery was hired as an assistant coach at Missouri State on May 1, 2022.

Lowery was hired as an assistant coach at Northwestern on July 27, 2022

Head coaching record

References

External links
 Kansas State profile
 Southern Illinois profile

1972 births
Living people
African-American basketball coaches
African-American basketball players
American men's basketball players
Basketball coaches from Indiana
Basketball players from Indiana
College men's basketball head coaches in the United States
Illinois Fighting Illini men's basketball coaches
Junior college men's basketball coaches in the United States
Kansas State Wildcats men's basketball coaches
Missouri Southern Lions men's basketball coaches
Point guards
Southeast Missouri State Redhawks men's basketball coaches
Southern Illinois Salukis men's basketball coaches
Southern Illinois Salukis men's basketball players
Sportspeople from Evansville, Indiana
21st-century African-American sportspeople
20th-century African-American sportspeople